Oulton is a hamlet and former civil parish, now in the parish of Woodside, near the small town of Wigton, in the Allerdale district of the county of Cumbria, England. In 1931 the civil parish had a population of 271. Oulton was formerly a township in Wigton parish, from 1866 Oulton was a civil parish in its own right until it was abolished on 1 April 1934 and merged into Woodside.

References

External links
 Cumbria County History Trust: Oulton (nb: provisional research only – see Talk page)

Hamlets in Cumbria
Former civil parishes in Cumbria
Allerdale